Landeh County is in Kohgiluyeh and Boyer-Ahmad province, Iran. The capital of the county is the city of Landeh. At the 2006 census, the region's population (as Landeh District of Kohgiluyeh County) was 21,151 in 3,973 households. The following census in 2011 counted 21,367 people in 4,584 households. It was separated from Kohgiluyeh County in September 2012. At the 2016 census, the county's population was 21,812 in 5,560 households, by which time the district had been separated from the county to form Landeh County.

Administrative divisions

The population history and structural changes of Landeh County's administrative divisions over three consecutive censuses are shown in the following table. The latest census shows two districts, four rural districts, and one city.

References

 

Counties of Kohgiluyeh and Boyer-Ahmad Province